Behavioral treatment programs include:

Psychological behavioral therapy in general, such as:
 Cognitive behavioral therapy

Congregate care facilities such as:
 Residential treatment center
 Therapeutic boarding school
 Wilderness therapy programs